In the video game industry during 2019, both Sony and Microsoft announced their intent to reveal their next-generation consoles in 2020, while Nintendo introduced a smaller Nintendo Switch Lite, and Google announced its streaming game platform Stadia. The controversy over loot boxes as a potential gambling route continued into 2019, with some governments like Belgium and the Netherlands banning games with them under their gambling laws, while the United Kingdom acknowledging their current laws prevent enforcing these as if they were games of chance. The first video cards to support real-time ray tracing were put onto the consumer market, including the first set of games that would take advantage of the new technology. The Epic Games Store continued its growth in challenging the largest digital PC game distribution service Steam, leading to concern and debate about Epic Games' methods to seek games for its service. Dota Auto Chess, a community-created mod for Dota 2, introduced a new subgenre of strategy games called auto battlers, which saw several games in the genre released throughout the year. Blizzard Entertainment faced criticism due to their involvement in the Blitzchung controversy, which began after they had banned a Hearthstone player for making comments during a tournament regarding the 2019–20 Hong Kong protests.

Top-rated games

Major awards

Critically acclaimed games
Metacritic is an aggregator of video game journalism reviews. It generally considers expansions and re-releases as separate entities.

Financial performance
SuperData Research estimated that the video game industry grew 4% in 2019, reaching  in global revenues.

Mobile game expenditures made up 56% of all video game-related revenues in 2019.

Highest-grossing games
The following were 2019's top ten highest-grossing video games in terms of worldwide digital revenue (including digital purchases, microtransactions, free-to-play and pay-to-play) across all platforms (including mobile, PC and console platforms). The top ten highest-grossing digital games of the year were all free-to-play games, each grossing more than  worldwide in 2019. Six of the top ten highest-grossing games, including the top five titles, are published and/or owned by Chinese conglomerate Tencent.

Best-selling games by country
The following were 2019's top ten best-selling video games by country, in terms of software units sold (excluding microtransactions and free-to-play titles) on PC and console platforms, for the United States, Japan, and United Kingdom.

Major events

Notable deaths

 May 14 – Tim Conway, 85, voice actor best known for the character Barnacle Boy in the "SpongeBob SquarePants" franchise.
 June 19 – Etika, 29, YouTuber and Twitch streamer who played Nintendo games.
 August 31 – Alec Holowka, 35, co-game designer on "Night in the Woods" and former co-founder of Infinite Fall.

Hardware releases
The list of game-related hardware released in 2019 in North America.

Game releases

Series with new entries
Series with new installments in 2019 include Ace Combat, Age of Wonders, Bloodstained, Borderlands, Bubsy, Call of Duty, Contra, Crackdown, Crash Bandicoot, Dead or Alive, Devil May Cry, Digimon, Dr. Mario, Earth Defense Force, Far Cry, Final Fantasy, Fire Emblem, Gears of War, God Eater, Kingdom Hearts, Luigi's Mansion, Mario & Sonic, Marvel: Ultimate Alliance, MediEvil, Metro, MLB The Show, Mortal Kombat, Need for Speed, No More Heroes, Onimusha, Persona, Pokémon, Rage, Resident Evil, Science Adventure, Shantae, Shenmue, Sonic the Hedgehog, Star Wars, Super Mario, Terminator, Tetris, The Legend of Zelda, Tom Clancy's Ghost Recon, Tom Clancy's The Division, Total War, Trials, Tropico, Umihara Kawase, Vampire: The Masquerade,  Wolfenstein, WWE 2K, Yooka-Laylee, Yoshi, and Yu-Gi-Oh!.

January–March

April–June

July–September

October–December

Video game-based film and television releases

See also
2019 in games

Notes

References

 
Video games by year